The NECC–ITF Women's Tennis Tournament is a tennis tournament on the ITF Women's Circuit, under the tier of the WTA Tour, played on outdoor hardcourts. It is held annually at the Shree Shiv Chhatrapati Sports Complex in Pune, India since 2001.

History
It is held yearly since 2001 in Pune, Maharashtra, India. It was a $10,000 event from 2001–2005, and was upgraded to $25,000 in 2006–2008. In 2009, it was a $50,000. Since 2010, it has been a $25,000 event. Akgul Amanmuradova has been the most successful at the event, winning two titles.

Results

Singles

Doubles

References

External links
 ITF search

 
Tennis tournaments in India
Sports competitions in Pune
Hard court tennis tournaments
ITF Women's World Tennis Tour
Recurring sporting events established in 2001
2001 establishments in Maharashtra